Boulter's Island is an island in the River Thames at Boulter's Lock, in the north-east suburbs of Maidenhead, Berkshire.  It is next to the Maidenhead (west) bank, separated by the lock cut. 
Boulter's Island is accessible by motor vehicle via Boulter's Bridge across the tail of Boulter's Lock. The island has a number of private houses, a restaurant and a small boatyard with a slipway.

Ray Mill Island lies alongside to the east and is a public park, separated from Boulter's Island by the Ray Mill Stream.

Richard Dimbleby, the BBC broadcaster, lived for many years in a house on Boulter's Island.

See also
Islands in the River Thames

References

External links

Islands of the River Thames
Maidenhead